Ancylosis hellenica is a species of snout moth in the genus Ancylosis. It was described by Otto Staudinger, in 1871, and is known from Greece, Bulgaria, North Macedonia and Turkey.

References

External links
lepiforum.de

Moths described in 1871
hellenica
Moths of Europe
Moths of Asia